This is a timeline of events during the War in Iraq in 2015.

Chronology

January 
 January 8 – A suicide bomber targets a police checkpoint in the town of Youssifiyah, killing seven people.
 January 21 - Beginning of the Mosul Offensive in which Peshmerga forces captured large amount of territory surrounding Mosul.
 January 26 – Iraqi forces recapture the entire province of Diyala from Islamic State.
January 29 – Battle of Kirkuk (2015) begins.

February 
 February 1 – Kurdish forces overcome ISIL militants in the city of Kirkuk.
February 24 – Multiple bomb attacks around Baghdad kill 37 people and wound dozens.

March 
 March 2 – Second Battle of Tikrit begins.
 March 25 – American airstrikes on Tikrit, several Shiite militias go on strike.

April 
 April – May: Al-Karmah offensive
 April 1 – After a month of hard fighting, Iranians, Iraqis and Shiite militia overcome ISIL fighters and take Tikrit.

May 
 May 15: ISIL seizes control of the main Government building and city centre in Ramadi, the provincial capital of Anbar Province.
 May 20: ISIL captures Ramadi.

June 
 June 4: ISIS fighters close Ramadi dam gates, cut off water to loyalist towns
 June 13: Militants attack government forces near Iraq's Baiji refinery, killing 11 near the city of Baiji as part of the battle for control of Iraq's biggest refinery.

July 
 July 13: Anbar offensive begins.
 July 17: A suicide bomber detonated a car bomb in a marketplace in the city of Khan Bani Saad during Eid al-Fitr celebrations, killing 120–130 people and injuring 130 more. Twenty more people were reported missing after the bombing.
 July 23: Turkey begins bombing alleged PKK bases in Northern Iraq.

August 

 August 13: 2015 Baghdad market truck bombing
 August 21: ISIS imposes a curfew on Mosul after residents spray anti-ISIS graffiti on several walls.

September

October 
 On October 22, Iraqi Security forces and the Popular Mobilization forces finished recapturing the city of Baiji, Iraq, its oil refinery and the surrounding region.

November 
 November 13: Kurdish forces take control of Sinjar from ISIS after it was seized by IS forces in August 2014.

December 
 December 16–17: Nineveh Plains offensive in which hundreds of ISIL fighters mount an attack against Kurdish positions but are repelled.

See also 
 2015 in Iraq
 Terrorist incidents in Iraq in 2015
 Timeline of ISIL-related events (2015)
 Timeline of the Iraq War (2014)
 Timeline of the Iraq War (2016)
 Timeline of the Iraq War (2017)

References 

Iraq War
Iraq War
Iraq War
Timelines of the War in Iraq (2013–2017)
Lists of armed conflicts in 2015